The 2018 SaskTel Tankard, the provincial men's curling championship for Saskatchewan, was held from January 31-February 4 at the Affinty Place in Estevan, Saskatchewan The winning Steve Laycock team will represent Saskatchewan at the 2018 Tim Hortons Brier in Regina, Saskatchewan.

Teams
The teams are listed as follows:

Knockout Draw Brackets

A Event

B Event

C Event

Playoffs

A vs. B
February 3, 7:00pm

C1 vs. C2
February 3, 7:00pm

Semifinal
February 4, 9:30am

Final
February 4, 2:30pm

References

2018 Tim Hortons Brier
Curling in Saskatchewan
2018 in Saskatchewan
January 2018 sports events in Canada
February 2018 sports events in Canada
Sport in Estevan